Mrs. Freshley's is an American brand of snack cakes produced and distributed by Flowers Foods. Varieties of this brand include Honeybuns, Pecan Twirls, Dreamies (similar to the Twinkie), Swiss Rolls, Peanut-butter Wafers (called Buddy Bars, similar to Nutty Bars), Brownies, Creme-filled Cookies, and many more.

See also

 List of brand name snack foods

References

External links

 Official page

Brand name snack foods
Flowers Foods brands